The coat of arms of Buzău is the heraldic symbol standing for the city of Buzău, Romania. The city's first recorded coat of arms dates back to 1831, and since then, the coat of arms has mostly kept its features, under different designs.

Description and symbolism
The shield is parted by a wavy azure fess. The upper half further parted per pale. In the right quarter, on azure, there is the image of the city's Communal Palace standing on a vert terrace. In the left corner, on gules, a mace and a sword, argent, crossed, with an or crown on top. The lower half shows, on argent, a Phoenix bird, sable, rising from a gules bonfire.

The bludgeon and sword stand for the battles that have taken place around the city, throughout history, and the Phoenix (symbol of rebirth) symbolizes the repeated reconstruction undergone by Buzău during the early modern times, as the city was destroyed by war and natural disasters, and depopulated by epidemics.

The shield is topped by a mural crown with seven towers, which shows the city's status as a county seat.

History
The first seal of Buzău dates back to the year 1831 and shows a Phoenix bird and a church. The church stood for the bishopric based in Buzău, while the Phoenix bird stood for the periods of destruction and subsequent reconstruction that the city had recently undergone.

The Communal Palace, inaugurated in 1901, became a symbol of the city and eventually made its way on the official coat of arms. Thus, the inter-war coat of arms of Buzău is similar to the present one, except for the mural crown which only had five towers, and a golden border on the shield.

After World War II, no symbol was used until 1970, when the communist government adopted a set of new insignia for the Romanian cities. The 1970 coat of arms was divided party per fess, with an inescutcheon divided party per pale and charged with the crest of Communist Romania (hammer and sickle symbol of the Romanian Communist Party on red, dexter; flag of Romania, sinister). The upper half was divided party per pale, azure and gules, with an argent Communal Palace on the right quarter, and industrial towers on the left quarter. The lower half retained the sable Phoenix rising from the gules bonfire, which had, by then, become the main symbol of Buzău.

After the Romanian Revolution of 1989, the Communist symbol was abolished and, again, the city was left without a coat of arms until 2006, when the present coat of arms was approved by the Romanian government.

Buzau
Buzău
Buzau
Buzau
Buzau
Buzau
Buzau
Buzau